Past Imperfect may refer to:

Television
 "Past Imperfect" (CSI: NY), a 2007 episode
 "Past Imperfect" (Holby City), a 2007 episode
 "Past Imperfect" (Roseanne), a 1994 episode

Literature
 Past Imperfect: Facts, Fictions, and Fraud, a 2004 nonfiction book by Peter Charles Hoffer
 Past Imperfect: French Intellectuals, 1944-1956, a 1992 book by Tony Judt
 Past Imperfect (novel), a 2008 novel by Julian Fellowes
 Past Imperfect, a 2001 memoir by Grisha Bruskin
 Past Imperfect, a 2005 poetry collection by Suzanne Buffam
 Past Imperfect, a 1942 autobiography by Ilka Chase
 Past Imperfect, a 1978 autobiography by Joan Collins
 Past Imperfect, a 2001 science fiction anthology edited by Martin H. Greenberg
 Past Imperfect, a story series in the British comic 2000 AD

Other uses
 Imperfect, or past imperfective, a verb form in several languages
 Past Imperfect, a 1990s series of etchings by Yoshiko Shimada
 Past Imperfect, a 2008 album by the Wreckery